

Definition 
Anaerobic membrane bioreactor or AnMBR is the name of a technology utilized in wastewater treatment. It is a new technology in membrane filtration for biomass retention. AnMBR works by using a membrane bioreactor (MBR). The sewage is filtered and separated leaving the effluent and sludge apart. This sludge is treated anaerobically by mesophilic bacteria which release methane as a byproduct. The biogas can later be combusted to generate heat or electricity. AnMBR is considered to be a sustainable alternative for sewage treatment because the energy that can be generated by methane combustion can exceed the energy required for maintaining the process.

References

Water treatment
Environmental engineering
Sanitation
Sewerage
Bioreactors
Membrane technology